The Awake Tour is the second concert tour by American singer-songwriter and actor Josh Groban. Visiting North America, Europe and Australasia over 8 months the tour supported his third studio album, Awake, released on November 7, 2006.

Background
The tour was announced on November 15, 2006 by 143/Reprise Records with initially only 29 dates from February 17 to April 7, 2007.  European dates were announced later on and more summer dates in the U.S. and Canada were announced in June 2007. The tour concluded on October 18, 2007 in Manila.

Opening Acts
Angelique Kidjo

Set list
(As per most concerts) 
"You Are Loved (Don't Give Up)"
"Mai"
"Un Dia Llegara"
"Un Giorno Per Noi"
"Now or Never"
"So She Dances"
"February Song"
"Alla Luce Del Sole"
Josh welcomes Lucia Micarelli
"Aurora" (Lucia on violin)
"Kashmir" (Lucia on violin)
Josh Groban returns entering through the audience 
"In Her Eyes"
"Pearls" featuring Angelique Kidjo (Sade cover)
"L'Ultima Notte"
"Remember When It Rained"
"Lullaby"
"Weeping"
"Machine"
Encore 
"Canto Alla Vita"
"You Raise Me Up"
"Awake"

Broadcasts and recordings

Tour dates

Cancelled or Postponed shows

References

2007 concert tours
Josh Groban concert tours